Adrian Blacow, also known by his stage name VHS Head, is a British electronic musician. His work employs samples from found footage, television programmes, and industrial films recorded onto videotape cassettes—namely VHS. Blacow began releasing his music in 2009 under the label Skam Records.

Discography

Studio albums
 Trademark Ribbons of Gold (2010)
 Persistence of Vision (2014)

Extended plays
 Video Club (2009)
 Midnight Section (2011)
 Sarah Eat Neon (2015)

References

21st-century British musicians
British electronic musicians
Living people
People from Blackpool
Year of birth missing (living people)